Jim Beloff (born December 25, 1955) is an American musician. He is a leading proponent of the ukulele. After working in the music industry in Los Angeles, he discovered the ukulele and became an advocate of the instrument.  He established Flea Market Music, publisher of the Jumpin' Jim's ukulele songbook series. Beloff's songbooks and instructional books (arranged by him and other well-known ukulele players), DVDs and promotion and marketing of his family's Fluke and Flea ukuleles have contributed to the popularity of the instrument. He is also a singer-songwriter and has recorded several solo CDs as well as two with his wife, Liz.

Early Endeavors 

Jim Beloff is a graduate of Hampshire College where he focused on musical theater.  After working on 1600 Pennsylvania Avenue, a short lived Broadway musical by Alan Jay Lerner and Leonard Bernstein, Beloff composed several children's musicals that were produced in New York City. For a while he worked selling advertising space for Ziff-Davis computer publications.   He then changed companies to Billboard Magazine and became associate publisher.  He and his wife Liz Maihock Beloff moved to Los Angeles where they become regulars at the monthly Rose Bowl Flea Market.  Having admired his father-in-law's skills on the ukulele, he purchased a used Martin tenor ukulele at the market and quickly fell in love with the instrument.

Many credit Beloff with being the driving force behind the recent resurgence of the ukulele.

Flea Market Music 

Not finding any current music available for the ukulele, Beloff discovered a dealers' cache of unused music from decades earlier.   With this reference material he and his wife, Liz, published Jumpin' Jim's Ukulele Favorites in 1992.  Its success spawned a series of music books for the ukulele.  Beloff expanded into DVDs as well, quitting his job at Billboard, he and his wife created Flea Market Music, Inc.  The rise in popularity of the ukulele, and the company's sales, have continued to grow with over 600,000 Jumpin' Jim's books in print.  The company offers over two dozen music books covering many genres.

Beloff's 1997 book The Ukulele: A Visual History lays out the history of the instrument with dozens of photographs of ukuleles and ukulele related memorabilia.  George Harrison liked the book so much that he wrote an endorsement and sent out copies to all his friends one Christmas.

Beloff has also written a concerto for ukulele and symphony orchestra entitled "Uke Can't Be Serious."  It debuted with The Wallingford Symphony Orchestra in 1999, conducted by Phil Ventre, and has been performed regularly since.  The concerto was played by Beloff and the Choate Rosemary Hall Orchestra in Germany and Austria in June, 2016.

The Magic Fluke Company 

Finding the availability of good ukuleles to be rather limited, Beloff was interested in developing an inexpensive, quality instrument.  This inspired his brother-in-law, Dale Webb, an engineer, to design the Fluke  and Flea ukuleles.  In 1999 Webb and his wife, Phyllis (Jim's sister) formed The Magic Fluke Company.  The instruments are made of lightweight, injection molded thermoplastic.  The instruments are durable while providing quality sound.  The flat bottoms of the designs allow them to stand without any other support.  The company has sold over 55,000 instruments since the first prototype. Located in Sheffield, Massachusetts, they use American made parts and materials to produce their instruments using environmentally responsible methods.

The newest addition to the line is the Firefly, a banjolele available with both Soprano or Concert sized neck.  In addition, the company now produces an electric ukulele, called the Fluke SB, an electric bass uke, called the Timber (named after the owners' Collie dog), and a violin/fiddle, called the Cricket.

UKEtopia 

In 1995, Beloff produced the first annual UKEtopia concert at McCabe's Guitar Shop in Santa Monica, California. The concert was a showcase for local and special guest ukulele players. Among the notable performances in the 1999 concert was Bill Tapia and Lyle Ritz trading jazz licks.

The 5th UKEtopia featured such performers as Ian Whitcomb, Janet Klein, and Peter Brooke Turner of the Ukulele Orchestra of Great Britain as well as the traditional finale of Beloff and his wife leading the audience in song and ukulele playing.

The 10th UKEtopia included two song sets from "Mr. Ukulele," Dan "Soybean" Sawyer, Fred Sokolow and "King Kukulele," and was summarized by Tom Teicholz in The Jewish Journal of Greater Los Angeles.

Personal life

Beloff and his wife, Elizabeth "Liz" Maihock married in 1987 and live in Connecticut. They continue to travel to promote the ukulele and their products, visiting ukulele festivals, giving performances and conducting workshops throughout the US and Canada.

Books 

 Jumpin' Jim's Ukulele Favorites, Flea Market Music, Inc., (1992) 
 Jumpin' Jim's Ukulele Tips 'N' Tunes: A Beginner's Method & Songbook, Flea Market Music, Inc., (1994) 
 Jumpin' Jim's Ukulele Gems, Flea Market Music, Inc. (1995) 
 Jumpin' Jim's Ukulele Christmas, Flea Market Music, Inc. (1998) 
 Jumpin' Jim's Gone Hawaiian, Flea Market Music, Inc., (1999) 
 Jumpin' Jim's '60s Uke-In, Flea Market Music, Inc. (1999) 
 Jumpin' Jim's Camp Ukulele, Flea Market Music, Inc. (2000) 
 Jumpin' Jim's Ukulele Beach Party, Flea Market Music, Inc., (2001) 
 Jumpin' Jim's Ukulele Masters: Lyle Ritz, Flea Market Music, Inc. (2001) 
 Jumpin' Jim's Ukulele Masters: Lyle Ritz Solos: 15 Chord Solos Arranged by the Ukulele Jazz Master, Flea Market Music, Inc. (2002) 
 Jumpin' Jim's Ukulele Masters: Herb Ohta, Flea Market Music, Inc., (2002) 
 Jumpin' Jim's Ukulele Spirit, Flea Market Music, Inc. (2002) 
 Jumpin' Jim's Gone Hollywood, Flea Market Music, Inc. (2003) 
 The Ukulele: A Visual History, Backbeat Books, (2d Ed 2003) 
 Jumpin' Jim's Ukulele Masters: John King, The Classical Ukulele, Flea Market Music, Inc. (2004) 
 Jumpin' Jim's Ukulele Island, Flea Market Music, Inc. (2004) 
 Jumpin' Jim's The Bari Best, Flea Market Music, Inc. (2005) 
 Jumpin' Jim's Ukulele Country, Flea Market Music, Inc., (2005) 
 Jumpin' Jim's Happy Holidays, Flea Market Music, Inc. (2006) 
 Ukulele Fretboard Roadmaps, Fred Sokolow/Jim Beloff, Hal Leonard Corp, (2006) 
 Jumpin' Jim's Ukulele Masters: Lyle Lite: 16 Easy Chord Solos Arranged by Ukulele Jazz Master Lyle Ritz,  Flea Market Music, Inc. (2008) 
 Blues Ukulele, arr. By Fred Sokolow, Flea Market Music, Inc. (2008) 
 Elvis Presley for Ukulele, Hal Leonard Corp (2009) 
 Disney Songs For Ukulele, Hal Leonard Corporation, (2010) 
 Bluegrass Ukulele, arr. By Fred Sokolow, Flea Market Music, Inc. (2010) 
 The Daily Ukulele, Hal Leonard Corporation and Flea Market Music, Inc, (2010) 
 Rodgers & Hammerstein For Ukulele, Hal Leonard Corp. (2011) 
 From Lute To Uke, arr. By Tony Mizen, Flea Market Music, Inc. (2011) 
 Broadway Classics For Ukulele, Hal Leonard Corp. (2012) 
 The Baroque Ukulele, arr. By Tony Mizen, Flea Market Music, Inc. (2012) 
 The Daily Ukulele Leap Year Edition, Hal Leonard Corporation and Flea Market Music, (2012) 
 The Daily Ukulele: Baritone Edition, Hal Leonard Corporation and Flea Market Music, (2013) 
 Jazzing Up The Ukulele, Fred Sokolow (2015) 
 The Romantic Ukulele, Tony Mizen, Flea Market Music,(2015) 
 The Daily Ukulele To Go, Hal Leonard Corporation and Flea Market Music, Inc., (2015) 
 The Daily Ukulele: Leap Year Edition for Baritone Ukulele, Hal Leonard Corporation and Flea Market Music, Inc., (2017) 
 Jumpin' Jim's Ukulele Masters: James Hill — Duets For One, Flea Market Music, Inc.,(2017) 
 UKEtopia-Adventures in the Ukulele World, Backbeat Books, (November 2021)
 Coming soon The Daily Ukulele: Another Year, Hal Leonard Corporation and Flea Market Music, (forecast for 2023)

Discography 

 Jim Beloff, Jim's Dog Has Fleas, Flea Market Music, 1993
 Legends Of Ukulele, (producer), Rhino Records, 1998
 Jim Beloff For The Love Of Uke, Flea Market Music, 1998
 Lyle Ritz, Herb Ohta: A Night Of Ukulele Jazz, (producer) Flea Market Music, 2001
 Various Artists, The Finer Things, The Songs Of Herb Ohta & Jim Beloff, Flea Market Music, 2004
 Lyle Ritz, No Frills, (producer) Flea Market Music 2006
 Various Artists, Paradise Lost & Found, Flea Market Music, 2007
 Liz & Jim Beloff, Rare Air, Flea Market Music, 2009
 Dreams I Left In Pockets: 33 Songs By Jim Beloff 2-CD set, Flea Market Music, 2014 (FMM-1009)
 Two Ukulele Concertos, Flea Market Music, 2018 (FMM-1010)
 The Wind And Sun, Flea Market Music, 2020 (FMM 1011)

DVD 

 The Joy of Uke - Volume 1, Homespun Tapes 1998
 The Joy of Uke - Volume 2: Moving Beyond the Basics, Homespun Tapes, 2003 
 Lyle's Style: Ukulele Master Lyle Ritz Shares A Lifetime Of Performance Techniques, (producer) Flea Market Music 2009
 Jumpin' Jim's Ukulele Workshop, Homespun, 2011, ASIN: B0057CONAO

References

External links 
 Jim Beloff Music on Facebook
 "Uke Can't Be Serious" Concerto on YouTube
 Jim Beloff Interview NAMM Oral History Library (2007)
 The Magic Fluke Company

1955 births
Living people
American ukulele players
People from Meriden, Connecticut